Hey Rudolph! is the first studio album from the Australian children's pop group the Tin Lids. It was released in November 1991 and peaked at number 6 on the ARIA albums chart. The album has sold over 100,000 copies in Australia.

Background 

Australian children's pop group the Tin Lids released their debut album Hey Rudolph! of Christmas music in November 1991 via Mushroom Records. They had formed a year earlier with the line-up of Mahalia Barnes and her three younger siblings Eliza-Jane "E J", Jackie and Elly-May, all on vocals. They are the four children of Jane Mahoney and Jimmy Barnes. Hey Rudolph! was arranged, recorded and produced by David Frogatt, who also provided most of its instrumentation, at Jimmy's Freight Train Studios. "Christmas Day" was released as the album's lead and only single in November 1991. The song peaked at number 40 on the ARIA singles chart.

Track listing

 "Little Drummer Boy" - 4:48
 "The First Noel" - 4:12
 "Christmas Day" - 6:06
 "Little Donkey" - 3:43
 "If Santa Forgets (duet with Jimmy Barnes)" - 3:49
 "O Come All Ye Faithful" - 3:44
 "Jingle Bells/Rudolph the Red Nose Reindeer" - 6:08
 "We Three Kings" - 3:45
 "Away in a Manger" - 3:14
 "Do I Hear Laughing?" - 4:19
 "Twelve Days of Christmas" - 3:53
 "Hark the Herald Angels Sing" - 3:45
 "Silent Night" - 4:47
 "Mary's Boy Child" - 4:12
 "We Wish You a Merry Christmas" - 0:34

Charts

Certifications

Release history

References

1991 debut albums
Christmas albums by Australian artists
Children's music albums